Frances Ann Lebowitz (born October 27, 1950) is an American author, public speaker, and occasional actor. She is known for her sardonic social commentary on American life as filtered through her New York City sensibilities and her association with many prominent figures of the 1970s and 1980s New York art scene, including Andy Warhol, Martin Scorsese, Jerome Robbins, Robert Mapplethorpe, David Wojnarowicz and the New York Dolls. The New York Times has  called her a modern-day Dorothy Parker. Lebowitz gained fame for her books Metropolitan Life (1978) and Social Studies (1981), which were combined into The Fran Lebowitz Reader in 1994. She has been the subject of two projects directed by Martin Scorsese, the HBO documentary film Public Speaking (2010), and the Netflix docu-series Pretend It's a City (2021).

Early life and education
Lebowitz was born and raised in Morristown, New Jersey. She had one sister, Ellen. Her parents were Ruth and Harold Lebowitz, who owned Pearl's Upholstered Furniture, a furniture store and upholstery workshop. She developed a love of reading from an early age, to the point that she would surreptitiously read during class and neglect her homework. Lebowitz describes her "Jewish identity [as] ethnic or cultural or whatever people call it now. But it's not religious." She has been an atheist since age 7. She did not have a bat mitzvah, but did go to Sunday school until 15 and had a confirmation.

Lebowitz was a poor student overall, particularly in algebra, which she failed six times. She has called it "the first thing which they presented to me that I absolutely could not understand at all, and had no interest in understanding". She worked at a Carvel ice cream store. Her grades were so poor that her parents enrolled her in The Wilson School (now defunct), a private girls' Episcopal school, in Mountain Lakes, where her grades marginally improved but she had difficulty following the rules and was eventually expelled for "nonspecific surliness". She also was suspended from Morristown High School for sneaking out of pep rallies.

As an adolescent, Lebowitz was deeply affected by James Baldwin: "James Baldwin was the first person I ever saw on television who I heard talk like that—by which I mean, he was the first intellectual I ever heard talk... And I was just flabbergasted. That made me read him." She also enjoyed watching television appearances by Gore Vidal and William F. Buckley, though she did not agree with Buckley.

Early career
After being expelled from high school, Lebowitz earned her certificate of high school equivalency. When she was 18, her parents sent her to live with her aunt in Poughkeepsie, New York. She stayed for six months, and then in 1969 moved to New York City. Her father agreed to pay for her first two months in the city on the condition that she live at the women's-only Martha Washington Hotel. She then stayed with friends in New York apartments and Boston college dormitories, surviving by writing papers for students. At age 20, she rented a West Village apartment. To support herself, she worked as a cleaner, chauffeur, taxi driver and pornography writer. Lebowitz refused to wait tables because she claimed that sexual intercourse with the manager was a prerequisite for hiring at many restaurants.

At age 21, Lebowitz worked for Changes, a small magazine "about radical-chic politics and culture" founded by Susan Graham Ungaro, the fourth wife of Charles Mingus. She sold advertising space, and then wrote book and movie reviews. Andy Warhol then hired Lebowitz as a columnist for Interview, where she wrote a column called "I Cover the Waterfront". Then came a stint at Mademoiselle. During these years, she made friends with many artists, including Peter Hujar, whom she met in 1971, and Robert Mapplethorpe, who often gave her photos, many of which she threw away in the 1970s.

In 1978, her first book, Metropolitan Life, was published. The book was a set of comedic essays mostly from Mademoiselle and Interview, with titles such as "Success Without College" and "A Few Words on a Few Words". She often detailed things that she found irksome or frustrating in a dry, sardonic tone. After its publication, Lebowitz became a local celebrity, frequenting Studio 54 and appearing on television. This was followed by Social Studies (1981), another collection of comedic essays mostly from Mademoiselle and Interview, in which she explored topics such as teenagers, films, and room service. Years later, The Fran Lebowitz Reader (1994) was published, which included both books.

Writer's block and public persona 
Since the mid-1990s, Lebowitz has been known for her decades-long writer's block. Her last published book was Mr. Chas and Lisa Sue Meet the Pandas (1994), a children's book about giant pandas living in New York City who long to move to Paris. Since that time, Lebowitz has worked on various book projects that have not been completed. This includes Exterior Signs of Wealth, a long-overdue, unfinished novel, purportedly about rich people who want to be artists and artists who want to be rich. Her book Progress was first excerpted in Vanity Fair in 2004, but has yet to be completed as of 2023. When discussing her writer's block, she said: "My editor—who, whenever I introduce him as my editor, always says, 'easiest job in town'—he says that the paralysis I have about writing is caused by an excessive reverence for the written word, and I think that's probably true."

Due to her writer's block, Lebowitz has largely supported herself with television appearances and speaking engagements. She has said, "It's what I wanted my entire life. People asking me my opinion, and people not allowed to interrupt." She tours as a public speaker, represented by the Steven Barclay Agency. In addition, she has made several appearances on Late Night with David Letterman and had a recurring role as Judge Janice Goldberg on the television drama Law & Order from 2001 to 2007. She does still write journalistic pieces; Lebowitz has been employed as a contributing editor and occasional columnist for Vanity Fair since 1997.

Through her public appearances, Lebowitz has reached a wider audience who have come to know her trademark style. She is known for her clever quips and observational humor on a range of topics, including New York City, gentrification, art, literature, and politics. She typically wears men's suit jackets (made bespoke by the Savile Row firm of Anderson & Sheppard), white shirts, cowboy boots, Levi's jeans, and tortoiseshell glasses. She often speaks of her treasured pearl-grey 1979 Checker cab, the only car she has ever owned, which she describes as "the only monogamous relationship I've ever had in my life". In September 2007, Lebowitz was named one of the year's most stylish women in Vanity Fair's 68th Annual International Best-Dressed List. She is also known for her massive book collection, 10,000 volumes in all, including at least one shelf of soap-carving books, and her refusal to use many technologies, including cell phones and computers. A heavy smoker, Lebowitz is an advocate for smokers' rights. She has not otherwise used drugs or alcohol since she was 19, which she says is because she reached her "lifetime supply" of both by that age.

In 2010, Lebowitz was introduced to a new generation of audiences, when she was featured in the documentary Public Speaking. On November 17, 2010, she returned to The Late Show with David Letterman after a 16-year absence, to promote the documentary. She discussed her years-long writer's block, which she jokingly referred to as a "writer's blockade". On November 22, 2010, HBO debuted Public Speaking, Martin Scorsese's documentary about her containing interviews and clips from speaking engagements. Lebowitz also made an appearance as a judge in Scorsese's 2013 film The Wolf of Wall Street. She collaborated  with Scorsese again on the 2021 Netflix series Pretend It's a City, in which Scorsese interviews her about New York City and other subjects.

Views

New York City 
Lebowitz has been critical of the gentrification and changing culture of New York City. She explained that the main difference between "Old New York" and "New New York" is the influence and dominance of the culture of money. While New York was always an expensive city, people who were not rich could live in Manhattan and "you didn't have to think about money every second." This was because, among other reasons, "there were a zillion bad jobs. That doesn't exist any more. I mean, I could wake up one afternoon with zero money—I don't just mean in the house, I mean to my name—and know that by the end of the day, I would have money."

She has been critical of New York mayors Rudy Giuliani and Michael Bloomberg for making New York more "suburban" and accelerating gentrification in Manhattan. She has also been critical of the large numbers of wealthy people in New York City, as she believes they do not create anything of value but only consume things. Of Bloomberg, she said:

Of Giuliani's law enforcement policies she said, "When Giuliani was the mayor, every five minutes an unarmed black man was shot in the back." Lebowitz abhors New York City's high number of tourists, calling the shift in the 1980s toward promoting the city as a tourist destination "an incredibly horrible idea". She has cited tourism as a cause of New York's housing shortage because hotels are built rather than apartment buildings, and described the negative effects of gearing the city's economy towards tourists: "You cannot lure these herds of hillbillies into the middle of a city, and not have it affect the city."

Of the homelessness crisis in New York, she has said, "Any New Yorker who walks down the street in this rich city ... you can't even hear anything because the money's making so much noise now, and see people in the street and not feel this is a disgrace to the country, it's a disgrace to the city."

In 2022, Lebowitz was a guest on Questlove's "Quest for Craft". She discussed how New York City is important to her craft, and how a sense of place is important to writers.

Impact of HIV/AIDS 
In the 1980s, many of her gay male friends died of HIV/AIDS. Lebowitz has discussed the impact of the "plague years" on American culture. In particular, she has spoken about the cultural void that was left behind from losing a generation of talented artists and intellectuals. Many of these men not only produced art and intellectual culture, but they also were the passionate audiences that nurtured such culture. As she explained in a 2016 interview:What is culture without gay people? This is America, what is the culture? Not just New York. AIDS completely changed American culture...  And with AIDS, a whole generation of gay men died practically all at once, within a couple of years. And especially the ones that I knew. The first people who died of AIDS were artists. They were also the most interesting people... The knowing audience also died and no longer exists in a real way... There's a huge gap in what people know, and there's no context for it anymore.In 1987, Lebowitz published a piece in The New York Times titled "The Impact of AIDS on the Artistic Community".

Feminism 
Lebowitz has been called the "opposite of lean-in feminism". She said in a 2019 interview:If [feminism] really worked, there wouldn't be feminism anymore. There's a couple of things that have changed so much for the better, and the life of a girl is a billion times better than when I was a girl. There's no comparison. It's so much better, and yet it's still horrible. That will tell you what it was like, okay?

In another interview, she said, "I didn't pay much attention to it, largely because it never occurred to me it would work. I was, unfortunately, largely right." She has also said, "The way girls are raised now. It's so different... When I was a child, if you wanted to do something and you were not allowed to do it, very often, the answer to why not would be: because you're a girl."

Of the MeToo movement, she said, It never occurred to me this would ever change. Being a woman was exactly the same from Eve till eight months ago. So it never occurred to me that it would change. Ever. I can tell you that it's probably one of the most surprising things in my life. The first forty guys who got caught—I knew almost all of them.

Politics 
Lebowitz identifies as a liberal Democrat and is often critical of moderate Democratic politicians and policy. She has been a vociferous critic of the Republican Party for many years and more recently of former president Donald Trump. She has said that Trump's appeal to his voters is "racism, pure and simple," and described Trump campaign rallies as reminiscent of those held by the Ku Klux Klan and George Wallace. She has called Trump "a cheap hustler," "stupid," "lazy," and "a little crazy, but mostly he's dumb." Of Trump's election in 2016, she said, "It was horrible. I felt that strongly affected emotionally for at least a month. My level of rage, always high, is now in fever pitch all the time." She joked, "If there's one upside to all this [Trump's election], it's that it's gotten Trump out of New York."

Lebowitz has been critical of many other politicians. She has expressed antipathy for Bill Clinton for moving the Democratic Party to the right, saying, "to me he seemed like a Republican...when he signed that welfare bill I went insane. He was a successful moderate Republican president." Lebowitz has spoken of her dislike for Bernie Sanders, calling him at one point "an unbelievably irritating, narcissistic old man" who took votes away from her candidate of choice, Hillary Clinton. She often describes Ronald Reagan as "the template for the stupid President," saying that "before Reagan there was no idea the president could be stupid."

Lebowitz has said she believes the Second Amendment has been misinterpreted, and guarantees individuals the right not to bear arms but rather to form militias. Of the gun rights debate, she has said:

In May 2019, Lebowitz said on Real Time with Bill Maher that Trump should suffer the same fate as Jamal Khashoggi, the Washington Post columnist the CIA believes was tortured and murdered on orders from Saudi Crown Prince Mohammed bin Salman. Lebowitz walked back her comments later in the same program.

Personal life
Lebowitz is open about her personal life and is a lesbian. She has spoken about having difficulty with romantic relationships. In 2016, she said, "I'm the world's greatest daughter. I'm a great relative. I believe I'm a great friend. I'm a horrible girlfriend. I always was."

Lebowitz was a close, longtime friend of Toni Morrison.

Lebowitz is "famously resistant to technology". She has no cellphone, computer, or typewriter.

Work

Filmography 
Film

Television

Bibliography
Metropolitan Life, Dutton, 1978. 
Social Studies, Random House, 1981. 
The Fran Lebowitz Reader, Vintage Books, 1994, 
Mr. Chas and Lisa Sue Meet the Pandas, Knopf, 1994. 
Progress [Unfinished], New York : Knopf, 2003,  
 
Exterior Signs of Wealth [Unfinished]

References

External links

 
 Fran Lebowitz interview Index magazine
 Fran Lebowitz interview mrbellersneighborhood.com
 Fran Lebowitz interview Black Book
 Fran Lebowitz interview The Onion A.V. Club
 PEN 2013 Master/Class with Fran Lebowitz and A. M. Homes
 
 
 
 

1950 births
20th-century American non-fiction writers
20th-century American women writers
21st-century American actresses
21st-century American non-fiction writers
21st-century American women writers
Jewish American atheists
American humorists
American satirists
American television actresses
American women non-fiction writers
Jewish American writers
LGBT Jews
LGBT people from New Jersey
American lesbian actresses
American lesbian writers
Living people
Morristown High School (Morristown, New Jersey) alumni
New York (state) Democrats
People from Morristown, New Jersey
Women satirists
Writers from New Jersey
Writers from Manhattan